Khimik Stadium is a multi-purpose stadium in Dzerzhinsk, Russia.  It is currently used mostly for football matches and is the home stadium of Khimik Dzerzhinsk.  The stadium holds 5,266 people, all seated.

External links
Stadium information

Football venues in Russia
Multi-purpose stadiums in Russia